Darren Lim (born 30 September 1972) is a Singaporean actor and television host. He was prominently a full-time Mediacorp artiste from 1997 to 2016 but continues to film on an ad-hoc basis.

Career
Having left school at age 15, Lim began his career as a singer before joining the Television Corporation of Singapore, Mediacorp's predecessor, in the mid-1990s. He joined SPH MediaWorks in 2000 and was transferred back to Mediacorp when both companies merged in 2005. Since rejoining Mediacorp, his profile rose considerably and was nominated for the Best Supporting Actor several times, most notably for his role in The Little Nyonya.

Lim left Mediacorp in May 2012 after some 20 years in showbiz to work at his father's business and spend more time with his family. He has since returned to acting, but in a freelance capacity.

Personal life
Lim married fellow artiste Evelyn Tan in 2004. Lim left the entertainment industry to help his brother with his business and spend more time with his family. The couple has four children.

Filmography

Television

Film
 A Wonderful World 奇异旅程只真心爱生命饰新加坡便警
 Bad Boys In Wonderland 坏孩子俱乐部 1995
 Telemovie
 Tapioca Porridge (English)

Variety show

Stage
 Beauty World 美丽新世界 1998

Album
 阳光系列专辑

Advertisement
 Guess 服饰
 Bodynits 服饰
 Adidas 服饰

Awards and nominations

References

External links
Profile on xin.msn.com

Living people
1972 births
Singaporean male television actors
Singaporean people of Chinese descent